Khakriz (also Romanized as Khākrīz and Khāk Rīz; also known as Khakir and Khākraz) is a village in Ijrud-e Bala Rural District, in the Central District of Ijrud County, Zanjan Province, Iran. At the 2006 census, its population was 162, in 41 families.

References 

Populated places in Ijrud County